The 2018 Ghanaian Premier League was the 62nd season of top professional association football in Ghana. The season was initially scheduled to begin on 11 February 2018, but was postponed to 4 March 2018, and later postponed indefinitely. It was then scheduled to begin on 17 March 2018. The league kicked off on 17 March with a match between Inter-Allies vs Bechem United in Tema.

The Premier League was later cancelled in June 2018 by government directive following the Number 12 Expose corruption scandal within Ghana Football Association.

Teams

Standings
Last updated 6 June 2018 (championship suspended following government directive).

Season statistics

Scoring

Top scorers

See also
2018 Ghanaian FA Cup

References

Ghana Premier League seasons
Ghana
1
1